Herkale Airport  is an airstrip  northwest of the hamlet of Khôr ‘Angar in Djibouti. Khôr ‘Angar is by the Bab-el-Mandeb strait, the entrance to the Red Sea.

See also
Transport in Djibouti
List of airports in Djibouti

References

External links
 OurAirports - Herkale Airport
 FallingRain - Herkale Airport

Airports in Djibouti